Twynholm is a village in Scotland. It is in the historic county of Kirkcudbrightshire , Dumfries and Galloway.

The etymology of the name is uncertain. It may be from the British twyn (a bank or hillock) and the Saxon hame meaning home, or be of Scots derivation and mean "between the river banks".

History

The village was founded in the 16th century when two mills were set up on the burn which passes through the village centre. In the 18th century, the first school was built in the village, with the current primary school built in 1911. Twynholm was a parish from medieval times until 1975, including the neighbouring parish of Kirkchrist from 1654.

In 1887, John Bartholomew's Gazetteer of the British Isles described Twynholm like this:

There are a variety of listed buildings in the vicinity including the ruins of the 16th century Cumstoun Castle, and the parish church. The church was constructed in 1818 and was restored and the roof replaced in 1914. In 1963, a church porch was added.

Notable residents 
 Finlay Carson (born 1967), Member of the Scottish Parliament (MSP) for the Galloway and West Dumfries constituency since the 2016 Scottish Parliament election, born, raised and lives in Twynholm
 David Coulthard (born 1971), former Formula One racing driver, is from Twynholm.

See also
List of places in Dumfries and Galloway

References

External links
 Link to article about the Twynholm Hoard

Villages in Dumfries and Galloway
Parishes in Dumfries and Galloway